Petukhi is a rural locality (a selo) and the administrative center of Petukhovsky Selsoviet, Klyuchevsky District, Altai Krai, Russia. The population was 874 as of 2013. There are 9 streets.

Geography 
Petukhi is located 31 km east of Klyuchi (the district's administrative centre) by road. Makarovka is the nearest rural locality.

References 

Rural localities in Klyuchevsky District